George Travis (born 1741 in  Royton – died 1797 in Hampstead) was Archdeacon of Chester from his installation on 27 November 1786 until his death on 24 February 1797.

Travis was educated at Manchester Grammar School and St John's College, Cambridge. He was ordained deacon on 3 March 1765; and priest on 22 December 1765. He held livings at Eastham, Bromborough and Handley.

References

1741 births
People educated at Manchester Grammar School
People from Royton
18th-century English Anglican priests
Archdeacons of Chester
1797 deaths
Alumni of St John's College, Cambridge
Clergy from Lancashire